Mucispirillum is a genus in the phylum Deferribacterota (Bacteria). It is represented by the single species Mucispirillum schaedleri|. It has been found in the intestinal tract of some rodents and considered a commensal with some association to disease. This species has been found in cockroaches  mice, turkeys, dogs, pigs, goats, termites, and sometimes humans. It is anaerobic and does not form spores. It is motile, flagellated and thought to have the ability to move through mucus.

Etymology
The name Mucispirillum derives from Latin noun mucus, mucus; New Latin dim. neuter gender noun spirillum, a small spiral; New Latin neuter gender noun mucispirillum, a small spiral rod of the mucus.

Species
This genus contains a single species, namely M. schaedleri (Robertson et al. 2005, (Type species of the genus).; New Latin genitive case noun schaedleri, of Schaedler, in honour of Russell Schaedler, active in the study of the bacteria of the intestinal tract of mammals.

See also
 Bacterial taxonomy
 Microbiology

References 

Bacteria genera
Monotypic bacteria genera
Deferribacterota